Gerakarou is a village and a community of the Langadas municipality. Before the 2011 local government reform it was part of the municipality of Koroneia, of which it was a municipal district. The 2011 census recorded 1,223 inhabitants in the village. The community of Gerakarou covers an area of 17.847 km2.

See also
 List of settlements in the Thessaloniki regional unit

References

Populated places in Thessaloniki (regional unit)